Hucbert ( 820 – 864) was a Frank and son of the count Boso the Elder. Therefore, he was a Bosonid, and the namesake for the Huberterian branch of the family. His rise to power commenced under Lothair I but continued under Lothair II, reaching its apex when his sister Theutberga married Lothair II, a prince of the Carolingian dynasty, the imperial family of Francia. Hucbert also served as the lay-abbot of the Abbey of Saint Maurice-in-Valais. This gave him control over the Mons Iovis pass, the main route between Francia and Italy. Hucbert later gained power in the region of Transjurane Burgundy (859) which is what helped him later to find safety within the kingdom of Charles the Bald.

The region beyond the Jura Mountains was granted by Lothair II to his brother Louis II in 859. This was the power base of Hucbert and Lothair had therefore removed Hucbert and his influence from his kingdom. Hucbert resisted Louis II's rule during 863–4, proving rebels with safe havens within the deep mountains passes under his control.

Lothair had pursued the marriage with Theutberga in order to secure his weak southern border, as Hucbert had control of several key alpine passes, to protect from his brother Louis II. Following the 856 Treaty of Orbe, peace was formed between the brother Lothair II and Louis II meaning the alliance with Hucbert, and marriage with Theutberga, was no longer imperative. Lothair first tried to obtain a divorce in 858 via a trial by ordeal (scalding water); Theutberga's champion removed his hand from the water in front of an assembly of Lotharingian bishops 'uncooked'. The trial is believed to have been passed due to a faction supporting the queen and Hucbert, giving Hucbert incredible strength inside Lothair's court. Lothair was forced to take Hucbert's sister back, but he tried for divorce again in 860 accusing Theutberga of incest with Hucbert and even aborting their child. Theutberga confessed then fled to her brother in the neighbouring kingdom of West Francia. This meant Charles the Bald could block the two from entering Lotharingia for judgement, effectively slowing the process, also as the pair are under the protection of Charles the Bald. The divorce attempts ultimately failed thanks to the involvement of Pope Nicholas I and Lothair died still married to Theutberga. 

There are several main explanations for Lothair attempting to achieve a divorce from Theutberga, all given by Stone and West:  
 The changing political significance of Theutberga's family, specifically Hucbert. 
 Alternatively we can see Lothair as motivated against Hucbert whose political value had vanished following the Treaty of Orbe. This making Theutberga the unwanted legacy of an outdated alliance, and by 860 Hucbert had been considerably weakened politically with areas under his control removed from Lothair's kingdom. The lack of power is further supported due to the lack of resistance towards Lothair in 860, with Hucbert having fled to West Francia.

Hucbert was killed in 864 by the 'sons of Conrad', meaning Conrad the Younger and Hugh, Duke of Alsace. It was recorded in the 10th century that Hucbert had raided the abbey of Lobbes in 864 and usurped the abbot's seat before dividing its holdings, just prior to his death.

Hucbert was the father of Theobald of Arles (c. 854 – c. 895), who married Bertha, the daughter of Lothair II and his concubine Waldrada of Lotharingia. Theobald later supported Lothair's son Hugh during his insurgency; he is declared in the Annals of Fulda as 'the leader of Hugh's army'.

References

Bosonids
820s births
864 deaths
Year of birth uncertain